Donniel Hartman is an Israeli Modern Orthodox rabbi and author. He is President of the Shalom Hartman Institute in Jerusalem, Israel.

Biography
Donniel Hartman has a doctorate in Jewish philosophy from The Hebrew University of Jerusalem, a Master of Arts in political philosophy from New York University, and a Master of Arts in religion from Temple University. He has rabbinic ordination from the Shalom Hartman Institute.

Rabbinic and academic career
He has written books and essays on Judaism and modernity and is a frequent speaker at academic conferences and synagogues in the United States and Canada. In 2009, he spoke at the Grand Valley State University Conference, "Religion and the Challenges of Modernity." In the 1990s, he was scholar in residence at the Jewish Community Center of the Palisades in New Jersey. He was described by a Reform Judaism organization as a thinker "whose thoughts, observations, and analysis of Israeli society are radical and refreshing."

Hartman has established a program at the Shalom Hartman Institute that will lead to the ordination of rabbis - men and women - outside of existing Orthodox rabbinical seminaries in Israel.

He has argued for the need for Israelis to accept a two-state solution that recognizes Palestinian interests and to provide a "multiple narrative" for Israel that accepts non-Jewish Israelis.

He has said that Israel and Diaspora Jewry must "rethink" their relationship.

In 2007, Donniel Hartman founded a religious high school for girls, the Midrashiya, whose curriculum includes "a critical approach to the study of Jewish texts," volunteer work, and a sex-education curriculum, "one of the first ever among religious schools in Israel."

Published works
Putting God Second: How to Save Religion from Itself, 2016
The Boundaries of Judaism (Continuum Books, 2007) 
Judaism and the Challenges of Modern Life, Co-Editor with Moshe Halbertal (Continuum Books, 2007) 
"Mishpatim: A Man in Public," in The Modern Men's Torah Commentary: New Insights from Jewish Men on the 54 Weekly Torah Portions, Jeffrey K. Salkin, Ed. (Jewish Lights Publishing, 2009) 
Speaking iEngage: Creating a New Narrative Regarding the Significance of Israel for Jewish Life (Shalom Hartman Institute, 2013) ASIN: B00HBAYLSY
Putting God Second: How to Save Religion from Itself (Beacon, 2016)

See also
David Hartman
Yossi Klein Halevi
Menachem Lorberbaum

References

External links
Shalom Hartman Institute website
Hartman's official blog
 Hartman's official Facebook page

Israeli Modern Orthodox rabbis
20th-century Israeli rabbis
21st-century Israeli rabbis
Philosophers of Judaism
Israeli philosophers
Jewish philosophers
Living people
Hebrew University of Jerusalem alumni
New York University alumni
Date of birth missing (living people)
20th-century Jewish theologians
21st-century Jewish theologians
Year of birth missing (living people)